The cobbled classics are four cycling classics held in March and April. Cobblestones, like mountainous terrain, are important elements in courses of cycling. Many classic cycle races in northwestern Europe contain cobbled sections. The two Monuments of this race type are the Tour of Flanders and Paris–Roubaix, with over 20 cobbled sectors.

History

The first race with cobbled sections is Omloop Het Nieuwsblad, which traditionally opens the Belgian classics season, followed the next day by Kuurne–Brussels–Kuurne. Starting late March, the Flemish Cycling Week (Vlaamse Wielerweek) kicks off the most important period for cobbled cycling classics. Currently it features the Dwars door Vlaanderen on Wednesday, the E3 Harelbeke on Friday, and Gent–Wevelgem on Sunday. During the following week, the stage-race Driedaagse van De Panne keeps the riders busy, concluding with the Monument Tour of Flanders on Sunday. The Scheldeprijs on the following Wednesday prepares the riders for the historical Paris–Roubaix (another Monument), which ends the cobbled classics.

Among the cobbled cycling races, the three most historical are usually held on consecutive Sundays in March and April: Gent–Wevelgem, Tour of Flanders and Paris–Roubaix. Gent–Wevelgem has lost a lot of its historical status due to the relative easiness of the route. The E3 Harelbeke is considered to be harder and thus better preparation for the Ronde and Roubaix. In 2012, both races received equal status on the UCI World Tour. In 2017, Omloop Het Nieuwsblad (the opening event of the Belgian cycling season, as well as the first race of the year in Northwestern Europe) and Dwars door Vlaanderen became World Tour races.

In 2012 Belgian rider Tom Boonen managed to win all four races in the same season, as the first and only rider to do so.

In the 2010s, some of the races have been joined by equivalent races for women - Gent–Wevelgem for Women, Tour of Flanders for Women and Paris–Roubaix Femmes.

Winners since 1990

Statistics

Most cobbled classics wins per male rider

See also
 Ardennes classics
 Classic cycle races

References